Dirty Ho (爛頭何 Lan tou He) is a 1979 Hong Kong martial arts-comedy film directed by Lau Kar-leung and starring Gordon Liu and Wong Yue.

Plot

Master Wang is actually the 11th prince of Manchuria in disguise. Posing as a sophisticated jewellery dealer and connoisseur of fine art and wine, the prince is trying to determine which of the other 14 heirs to the throne is trying to assassinate him. A jewel thief, Dirty Ho (Wong Yue) runs afoul of the prince, who uses Ho to help him flush out his enemies.

Wang is a martial arts expert, but in order to conceal his identity he systematically hides his skills, even as he deploys them.

In the opening sequence of the film proper (after a title sequence which already features two highly abstract fight sequences by the principals) Wang encounters a jewel thief named Dirty Ho at a brothel. They come into conflict by vying with one another for the attentions of the courtesans. Dirty Ho, who is not too bright, can't figure out why his efforts to fight with the seemingly cowardly, effete Wang inevitably result in clumsy disaster. It is Wang, of course, who skillfully deflects Ho into tripping over chairs and so forth.

In a later confrontation with Ho, Wang pretends that a female musician is his "bodyguard", invisibly manipulating the bewildered woman's arms, legs and musical instrument in order to make her fight with Ho and eventually to graze him in the forehead with a poisoned blade.

It is, however, all part of Wang's scheme: he is secretly protecting Ho from the police, and is training the bumbling Ho as his disciple and bodyguard. Ho eventually seeks out Wang in order to discover the antidote for the poison, which Wang administers to him in return for Ho's becoming his disciple.

Ho is initially puzzled at this since he has not detected any kung fu prowess in his master at all, and he remains initially a clueless bystander during two attempts on Wang's life: first, an attack at a wine-tasting, and then a visit to an antique-dealer's shop. Wang manages to defend himself admirably while maintaining the fiction that he is simply having a friendly aesthetic conversation with his opponents. Only at the end of the antique-shop attack does Ho figure out what's going on and intervene, but Wang receives a wound in the leg through a stratagem of the antiques dealer.

The master and his disciple sequester themselves in their residence – Wang for recovery, Ho for some kung fu lessons. But it is nearly time for the princes to assemble for the announcement of the heir to the throne, and so Wang and Ho undertake the dangerous journey to Peking with Wang in disguise, being pushed in a wheelchair by Ho.

Defeating an army of assassins in a ruined city, they manage to extract from the assassins' leader the identity of the Prince (Number Four) who is targeting Wang. The heroes then encounter their most formidable enemy, General Liang plus two other bad guys, and a climactic fight sequence follows.

They manage to defeat their enemies just in time for the prince to enter the throne room in time for the Emperor's appearance. Ho, outside the door, passes his master his necklace of beads on the pole they've used during the fight; the Prince takes them and deftly uses the pole to send Ho flying outside the room. The film ends with a freeze-frame on Dirty Ho in mid-air.

Cast
 Gordon Liu as the 11th prince/Mr. Wang
 Wong Yue as Dirty Ho
 Wang Lung Wei as Fan Chin-Kong (the wine merchant)
 Lo Lieh as General Liang
 Kara Hui as Choi Hung
 Hsiao Ho as Hsia Liu
 Chan Lung as Bitter Face

Dirty Ho does not follow the usual revenge plot of Shaw Brothers kung fu films at the time. Another of the film's unusual features is the fact that it features a Manchu character as the film's hero rather than as a villain.

References

External links
 

1979 films
1979 martial arts films
1970s action films
Hong Kong martial arts films
Shaw Brothers Studio films
Films directed by Lau Kar-leung
Kung fu films
Films set in the Qing dynasty
1970s Hong Kong films